The Kuwait men's national volleyball team represents Kuwait in international volleyball competitions and friendly matches. The team is currently ranked 131st in the world.

Asian Championship

Asian Games

References

National sports teams of Kuwait
National men's volleyball teams
Volleyball in Kuwait